GNOME Dictionary, also called gnome-dictionary, is a DICT client written in C by Emmanuele Bassi and others. It is part of the free software GNOME desktop suite. It allows users to look up words in various dictionary sources.

gnome-dictionary was at first an independent DICT protocol client called gdict, created by Bradford Hovinen, Spiros Papadimitriou and Mike Hughes; it was included inside the gnome-utils meta-package during the 1.x release cycle.  As a companion to the original application was also added an applet for gnome-panel.

After the 2.0 release of GNOME, due to lack of direct maintainership, the code base of gdict passed the point of being maintainable.  In October 2005, the current maintainer of gnome-dictionary Emmanuele Bassi decided to rewrite the application and applet from scratch, removing the old (and mostly deprecated) code.

The new gnome-dictionary was added to GNOME during the 2.13 development cycle and became part of the 2.14 GNOME release.  It supports multiple dictionary sources, printing the definitions found and saving them to a text file, and has a simpler user interface. The logic of the application and the applet has been moved inside its own shared library called libgdict which can be used by third-party applications. As of July 2006 the development version of gnome-dictionary became feature equivalent to the pre-2.14 release, with the addition of the list of similar words found (also known as speller).

References 

DICT clients
GNOME Applications
Free dictionary software
Language software for Linux
Dictionary software that uses GTK
Software that uses Meson